The 3rd Marine Infantry Division "San Marco" was one of four divisions raised by Mussolini's Italian Social Republic. It existed from 26 November 1943 until 29 April 1945.

History  
The Division was formed from former Italian Navy personnel and new conscripts from Northern Italy. The Division was trained in Germany and was ready for combat in July 1944. 

The 14,000 men strong Division was then sent to Liguria and was from July to October 1944, part of the Army Group Liguria under Marshal Graziani.
It made defensive preparations against a possible Allied landing and was also engaged in anti-partisan operations. 

Unlike the Monterosa Division which was sent to fight against the Americans at the Gothic Line, most of the San Marco Division remained in Liguria for the rest of the war fighting partisans. In August 1944 a unit was sent to France to fight against the Allies near Toulon, and two battalions were deployed along the Gothic Line to reinforce the Italian-German defence.

In Liguria, many soldiers of the Division deserted, and some 2,000 men were killed or wounded in the actions against the partisans.
On 24 April 1945 General Farina received the order to retreat from Liguria to the Ticino-Po line. 
The San Marco Division crossed the Po River and surrendered to the Allies at Mede, Lombardy on 29 April 1945.

Commanders
 General Aldo Princivalle : November 1943 - August 1944,
 General Amilcare Farina : August 1944 - April 1945

See also
Benito Mussolini
Repubblica Sociale Italiana (Italian Social Republic) [1943-1945]
Esercito Nazionale Repubblicano (Republican National Army)

References

Sources
San Marco Naval Infantry Division Flames of War
 Axis history

Infantry divisions of Italy in World War II